Nyceryx maxwelli is a moth of the  family Sphingidae. It is known from Bolivia and Venezuela.

The wingspan is about 63 mm. It is similar to Nyceryx continua cratera but the apex of the hindwing upperside is brown and the tornal area is not yellow. The basal area of the hindwing upperside is yellow, while the apex is brownish-orange.

Adults are on wing year round.

References

Nyceryx
Moths described in 1896
Invertebrates of Bolivia
Invertebrates of Venezuela
Moths of South America